Biegański (feminine Biegańska) is a Polish surname. Notable people with the surname include:

Guillaume Bieganski (1932–2016), French association football defender of Polish origin
Jan Biegański (born 2002), Polish footballer
Wiktor Biegański (1892–1974), Polish actor, film director and screenwriter

Polish-language surnames